The 2016 FIBA Oceania Under-18 Championship was the qualifying tournament for FIBA Oceania at the 2017 FIBA Under-19 World Championship. The tournament was held in Suva, Fiji from December 5 to December 10. New Zealand beat Australia in the final, 57–51, to win the country's first gold in this event.

Participating teams 
  (Hosts)

Venue 
 Vodafone Arena, Suva

Preliminary round 
All times given are local time (UTC+13)

Group A

Group B

Classification round
All times given are local time (UTC+13).

Classification 5–7

Fifth place game

Final round
All times given are local time (UTC+13).

Semifinals

Third place game

Final

Awards 

All-Tournament Team
 PG –  Michael Min
 SG –  Angus Glover
 SF –  Quinn Clinton
 PF –  Jacob Rigoni
 C –  Sam Waardenburg

Final ranking

References

External links
 2016 FIBA Oceania U-18 Championship

2016–17 in Oceanian basketball
2016 in Fijian sport
International basketball competitions hosted by Fiji
2016 in youth sport
FIBA Oceania Under-18 Championship